Kyrgyzstan participated in the 2011 Asian Winter Games in Almaty and Astana, Kazakhstan from January 30, 2011 to February 6, 2011. The bandy team took the country's 1st ever medal at Asian Winter Games.

Alpine skiing

Kyrgyzstan sent two alpine skiers.

Men
Alexander Trelevski
Dmitry Trelevski

Bandy

Kyrgyzstan sent a bandy team.

Results

Group A

All times are local (UTC+6).

Biathlon

Kyrgyzstan will send a biathlon team of 2 athletes.
Men
Azamat Bozhokoev
Zafar Shakhmuratov

Figure skating

Karina Uraimova was scheduled to represent Kyrgyzstan, but had to withdraw, because she had accreditation for only one year, and the requirement was two years.

Ice hockey

Men
The team is in the premier division for these games.

Premier Division

All times are local (UTC+6).

Roster
Sergei Osintsev 
Cyril Kudayarov 
Sergey Sorokin 
Sorokin Vladimir 
Artem Kolobov 
Denis Falfudinov
Igor Kryukov
Azmat Shiderinov
Igor Kryukov 
Filippov Ivan 
Ageev Dmitry 
Yuri Zhuravlyov 
Dmitry Kabanov 
Pavel Sazonov 
Ramis Toktaliev
Anvarbek Omorkanov 
Paul Fitisenko 
Jyrgalbek Bakirov 
Salamat Tynaliev 
Urmat Sheishenaly 
Turdaliev Askarbek
Amanbek Esen Uulu 
Andrew Musin 
Ismailov Adil

Ski orienteering

Kyrgyzstan will send a ski orienteering team.

Men
Tamerlan Dzhumabekov
Igor Gusev
Andrei Savinykh
Ruslan Kalpana

Women 
Evgeniia Chernobaeva
Olga Gorozhanina
Elena Rybalova
Anastasia Yusupov

References

Nations at the 2011 Asian Winter Games
Asian Winter Games
Kyrgyzstan at the Asian Winter Games